The 1987 African Men's Handball Championship was the seventh edition of the African Men's Handball Championship, held in Rabat, Morocco, from 3 to 12 July 1987. It acted as the African qualifying tournament for the 1988 Summer Olympics in Seoul.

In the final, Algeria win their fourth consecutive title beating Egypt in the final game.

Qualified teams

Group stage

Group A

Group B

Knockout stage

Semifinals

Third place game

Final

Final ranking

References

African handball championships
Handball
A
Handball
Handball in Morocco
African Men's Handball Championship, 1987
African Men's Handball Championship